William Eric Aalto (born William Oliver Ahlström, July 30, 1915 – June 11, 1958) was an American soldier and member of Abraham Lincoln Battalion, a unit that volunteered to fight during the Spanish Civil War for the Popular Front.

Early life
William Eric Aalto, of Finnish extraction, was born in the Bronx, New York on July 30, 1915. His mother had emigrated to the United States eight years earlier. She enrolled in the local communist party, educating her son with Marxist ideology. After leaving school, he worked as a truck driver and was a member of the Young Communist League.

Spanish Civil War
Aalto arrived in Spain on February 17, 1937, joining the other International Brigades at Albacete.  In March 1937 he joined the Spanish Communist Party. During the war, he volunteered for dangerous guerrilla operations which frequently required him to work behind enemy lines for up to weeks at a time. Working with International brigaders, Alex Kunslich and Irving Goff, Aalto was trained by Soviet instructors in the use of pressure-sensitive explosives to destroy railroad tracks, bridges and power lines. One of their objectives was the destruction of the main supply bridge spanning the Albarracín River. The operation may have been the inspiration for Ernest Hemingway's novel For Whom the Bell Tolls.

At the end of 1937, Aalto took part in the Battle of Teruel, working behind enemy lines again with Kunslich, Goff and Spanish guerrillas.

On May 23, 1938, Aalto, now a lieutenant, led the successful amphibious operation at Carchuna, Motril on the southern coast of Spain, which resulted in the rescue of 300 Republican prisoners held in the Fort of Carchuna. This raid constitutes the only operation of its kind ever undertaken by the Spanish army. He was later promoted to captain on June 5.

In September 1938, with a Republican defeat in sight, the Abraham Lincoln Battalion was withdrawn from the front line and shortly afterwards disbanded. William Aalto returned to the United States.

During his time in Spain, Aalto wrote: "A soldier who is politically conscious that he is right and who has a feeling of community with his society... will do his job well."

Second World War
In 1941, Aalto's former comrade-in-arms, Irving Goff, recommended him for recruitment to the Office of Strategic Services. At this time, Aalto confessed to Goff that he was a homosexual. Goff and other OSS Lincoln veterans reported the fact to the organization's head, General William Donovan, requesting for him to be removed from their team.

In 1942, Aalto was transferred to a training camp at Camp Ritchie, Maryland. In September 1943, while training soldiers in demolition work, Aalto saw someone drop a live grenade and lunged for it. Before he could throw it away, the bomb exploded, severing his arm at the wrist.

Post-War
With the help of his disability pension and the G.I. Bill, he returned to further his education, studying poetry at Columbia University. At this time, he published several pieces of his writings in the New Masses. After his betrayal by the OSS Lincoln veterans, Aalto drifted away from contact with the Veterans of the Abraham Lincoln Brigade.

Aalto then travelled to Europe, where he met the poet W.H. Auden. Though sharing the company of other poets, Aalto now wrote little and tended towards alcoholism, frequently becoming violent. Toward the end of his life, he was poet James Schuyler's lover, and features in the latter's poem Dining Out with Doug and Frank.

William Aalto died of leukemia in June 1958, and was buried in Long Island National Cemetery.

References

External links
  Operation Carchuna (Spanish)
 Location of Aalto's grave
 Spartacus Educational (though contains some factual errors, including the photo)

1915 births
1958 deaths
20th-century American male writers
Abraham Lincoln Brigade members
American amputees
United States Army personnel of World War II
American people of Finnish descent
Burials at Long Island National Cemetery
Deaths from cancer in New York (state)
Deaths from leukemia
American gay writers
LGBT people from New York (state)
United States Army non-commissioned officers
Writers from the Bronx
Ritchie Boys
Members of the Communist Party USA
American communists